Mary Soderstrom (born 1942) is a novelist, short story and nonfiction writer.

Career
Her novel, The Violets of Usambara (Cormorant Books, March 2008), was supported by a grant from the Conseil des arts et des lettres du Québec which allowed her to do research in East Africa. That experience also shows up in her  book Green City: People, Nature and Urban Places (Véhicule Press). Tanga, Tanzania, the gateway to the East Usambara Mountains, is one of the 11 cities she uses in Green City as points of departure for discussing the way people have brought nature into cities over history.   This travel, as well as what she did for her non-fiction book The Walkable City: From Haussmann's Boulevards to Jane Jacobs' Streets and Beyond (Véhicule Press, 2008) prompted her to consider the role of the Portuguese over the last 700 years in the European exploration of the world.  Their story lies at the heart of Making Waves: The Continuing Portuguese Adventure (Véhicule Press, Fall 2010).

The University of Regina Press published her non-fiction chronicle entitled Frenemy Nations: Love and Hate between Neighbo(u)ring States in October 2019. The book was her sixteenth book, and sixth non-fiction work. Four years previously, Cormorant Books published her sixth novel River Music in May 2015. Her third short story collection, Desire Lines: Stories of Love and Geography, was published by Oberon Press in November 2013. It received a starred review in the January–February 2014 Quill and Quire: This collection is not to be missed," writes reviewer Joy Parks.

In 2020, the University of Regina Press published Concrete: From Ancient Origins to a Problematic Future.

Bibliography 
 The Descent of Andrew McPherson, McGraw Hill-Ryerson Press, 1976
 Maybe Tomorrow I'll Have a Good Time, Human Sciences Press, 1982
 Endangered Species, Oberon Press, 1995.
 Finding the Enemy, Oberon Press, 1997.
 The Words on the Wall; Robert Nelson and the Rebellion of 1837, Oberon Press, 1998.
 The Truth Is, Oberon Press, 2000.
 Re-creating Eden: A Natural History of Botanical Gardens, Véhicule Press, 2001.
 After Surfing Ocean Beach, Dundurn, 2004
 Green City: People, Nature and Urban Places, Véhicule Press, 2006
 The Violets of Usambara, Cormorant Books, 2008
 The Walkable City: From Haussmann's Boulevards to Jane Jacob's Streets and Beyond, Véhicule Press, 2008
 Making Waves: The Continuing Portuguese Adventure, Véhicule Press, 2010
 Desire Lines: Stories of Love and Geography, Oberon Press, 2013
 River Music, Cormorant Books, 2013
 Road through Time: The Story of Humanity on the Move, University of Regina Press, 2017
 Frenemy Nations: Love and Hate between Neighbo(u)ring States, University of Regina Press, 2019
 Concrete: From Ancient Origins to a Problematic Future, University of Regina Press, 2020

References

External links 
 Mary Soderstrom's blog
  Montreal Gazette: Swept up by River Music: Mary Soderstrom's new novel charts course of pioneering pianist
 Montreal Review of Books: Desire Lines
 Montreal Review of Books: Mary Soderstrom — The Roads We Build

1942 births
Living people
Canadian women novelists
Canadian non-fiction writers
Writers from Quebec
Canadian women short story writers
20th-century Canadian short story writers
21st-century Canadian short story writers
21st-century Canadian women writers
20th-century Canadian women writers
Canadian women non-fiction writers